Assumption Abbey, also known as the Abbey of Our Lady of the Assumption,  is a community of monks of the Cistercian Order of the Strict Observance, popularly known as Trappists. 

The Abbey, is located in Douglas County some twenty miles southeast of the small town of Ava, seventy-five miles southeast of Springfield, Missouri.

History
The monks first came to Ava, Missouri from New Melleray Abbey in Iowa in 1950 to establish the monastic life here. Assumption Abbey is popular for its fruitcakes. The fruitcake recipe they use was developed in its bakery, with the help of world class chef Jean-Pierre Augé, who at one time served in the royal employ of the Duke and Duchess of Windsor.

References

External links
 Assumption Abbey Official Web Site

Catholic Church in Missouri
Christian organizations established in 1950
1950 establishments in Missouri
Trappist monasteries in the United States